Washington High School of Information Technology (formerly Washington High School) is a magnet high school located in the Sherman Park neighborhood on the north side of Milwaukee, Wisconsin, United States. It is one of the oldest schools in the Milwaukee Public Schools system, and was founded in 1911.

In September 2005 Washington was divided into three "schools within a school," which are divided among the school's four floors. These are the School of Law, Education, and Public Service; Washington High School of Expeditionary Learning; and Washington High School of Information Technology.  In June 2010, LEAPS closed and was combined with EL and renamed Washington High School.  The Washington High School of Information Technology, which continues the legacy of the Career Specialty Program begun in 1976, has continued to operate.

In June 2011 the combined LEAPS and EL school was closed and merged into Washington High School of Information Technology, thus creating a single school again.

Athletics

Washington's athletic teams are known as the Purgolders, named for the school's colors of purple and gold. It competes in the Milwaukee City Conference.

Washington has garnered four boys basketball Division 1 state titles since 1985. It is part of an intense three-way rivalry with Rufus King High School and Vincent High School. These schools have accounted for 14 of the last 23 state titles in Division 1 boys basketball.

The girls' basketball team is one of three Milwaukee City Conference girls teams to have won a WIAA state title (Harold S. Vincent High School and Riverside University High School are the others), having done it five times, a Division 1 record. They also won three consecutive state titles (1994, 1995 and 1996).

Washington won the state championship in boys' cross country in 1930 and 1935 and tied for the championship with Bay View High School in 1932 in single-division contests, won the 1952 championship in the larger of two divisions, and won the 1964 championship in the largest of three divisions.

Demographics
77% Black, 774 students
15% Asian/Pacific Islander, 150 students
8% Hispanic, 80 students
0% American Indian/Alaska Native, 2 students

Notable alumni
Brian Burke, Wisconsin politician and legislator
Wally Cruice, NFL scout
Lee S. Dreyfus, Governor of Wisconsin
Michael Feldman, host of radio show Whad'Ya Know?
Earle W. Fricker, Wisconsin politician
Pat Harder, UW-Madison and NFL player
Otto Junkermann, former Wisconsin State Representative, former Brown County Supervisor
Norman R. Klug, Wisconsin politician
Herb Kohl, U.S. Senator
Tom Laughlin, actor
John Allen Paulos, writer, speaker, mathematics professor
Stan Pelecky, Wisconsin politician
Lois Plous, Wisconsin politician
Jack (Jackie) Porter, WHS, Class of 1962---sociologist, writer, and political activist
Mark Ryan, Wisconsin politician
Bud Selig, Commissioner of Baseball
Milton Shadur, United States judge
Paul Sicula, Wisconsin politician
Latrell Sprewell, former NBA basketball player
Erwin G. Tamms, Wisconsin politician
Fred W. Vetter, Jr., U.S. Air Force general
Gene Wilder, actor
Wayne F. Whittow, Wisconsin politician

References

High schools in Milwaukee
Educational institutions established in 1912
Public high schools in Wisconsin
Magnet schools in Wisconsin
1912 establishments in Wisconsin
North Side, Milwaukee